Dallas Murray Richards, CM, OBC (5 January 1918 – 31 December 2015) was a Canadian big band leader.

Richards and his band performed in the Lower Mainland, at PNE bandstand and the annual New Year celebration at the Bayshore Hotel. The band played 79 consecutive New Year's Eve concerts until his death on 31 December 2015.

Richards led his band for many years in a weekly CBC Radio show broadcast nationally from the Panorama Roof Ballroom of the Hotel Vancouver. He hosted a weekly one-hour show on radio station CISL.

Richards was commonly thought to be the lyricist of "Roar You Lions Roar", the fight song of the BC Lions football club set to the music of "I Love the Sunshine of Your Smile". However, Peggy Miller of CJCA, an Edmonton radio station, wrote the lyrics in 1953, and Richards arranged and popularized the song with his band's performance at games. His 1968 album CFL Songs popularized "Roar You Lions Roar", "Go Argos Go", "On Roughriders" and many other songs still heard to this day in CFL stadiums.

Awards and honours
 1994: Order of Canada, Member
 1994: First inductee into the BC Entertainment Hall of Fame

References

External links
Official site archived
 Entry at thecanadianencyclopedia.ca 
 
 

1918 births
2015 deaths
Canadian jazz bandleaders
Members of the Order of British Columbia
Members of the Order of Canada
Musicians from Vancouver